Justin Harper (born February 24, 1985 in Catawba, North Carolina) is an American college football coach and former professional Canadian football wide receiver. He is currently the tight ends coach at Old Dominion University. Before this, he served as the Interim Head Coach at Virginia State University and was the Wide Receivers Coach at Towson University in Towson, Maryland. His last professional stint was as a member of the BC Lions of the CFL. He was drafted by the Baltimore Ravens in the seventh round of the 2008 NFL Draft. He played college football at Virginia Tech.

Early years
Harper played football at Bandys High School, where he led his team to the state championship game as a senior, playing both wide receiver and defensive back.  He was recruited by Winthrop University to play basketball, but decided late in his senior season to try to become a Division I football player.  After graduating, he attended Hargrave Military Academy.  He then was recruited by Virginia Tech.

College career
Harper appeared in 51 games during his four-year career at Virginia Tech, finishing with 83 catches for 1,338 yards, a 16.1 per-catch average, and nine touchdowns.  Harper's best game probably came in his final collegiate contest when he caught four passes for 64 yards (including a 20-yard touchdown), and scored on an 84-yard punt return in the 2008 Orange Bowl against the University of Kansas.

As a senior in 2007, Harper played wide receiver alongside Eddie Royal and Josh Morgan and recorded career highs with 41 catches, 635 receiving yards and five touchdown receptions.  Together, Harper, Royal and Morgan combined for 120 catches during their final season at Virginia Tech.  As a junior in 2006, Harper finished fourth on the team in receptions with 21 catches for 324 yards and one touchdown.   During his sophomore season, he posted 16 catches for 295 yards and one touchdown, which came in the Hokies' 35-24 Gator Bowl victory over Louisville.  As a freshman in 2004, he caught five passes for 84 yards and a touchdown.

Professional career

NFL
Harper was drafted in the 7th round of the 2008 NFL Draft by the Baltimore Ravens . He would continue as a member of the Ravens for the next three seasons only receiving limited playing time during the preseason. Justin Harper was released prior to the start of the 2011 NFL season.

CFL
On March 13, 2012 the Saskatchewan Roughriders of the Canadian Football League announced that they had signed Harper to a contract.
On January 24, 2013 Harper was traded to the BC Lions along with Saskatchewan's third round pick in the 2014 CFL Draft in exchange for slotback Geroy Simon.  On May 24, 2013, a 3 days after the Lions signed Emmanuel Arceneaux, Harper was released.

References

External links
Saskatchewan Roughriders bio
Baltimore Ravens bio
Virginia Tech Hokies bio

1985 births
Living people
People from Catawba, North Carolina
Players of American football from North Carolina
American football wide receivers
American players of Canadian football
Virginia Tech Hokies football players
Baltimore Ravens players
Saskatchewan Roughriders players